Mortensrud is a neighborhood in the borough of Søndre Nordstrand, in Oslo, Norway. The area has two primary schools, Mortensrud and Stenbråten, and a lower secondary school, Lofsrud. The area is served by the rapid transit station Mortensrud.

The area is notable for the modern award-winning church, Mortensrud church.

Neighbourhoods of Oslo